Robert White (also Whyte; c. 1538 – 1574) probably born in Holborn, a district of London, was an English composer whose liturgical music to Latin texts is considered particularly fine. His surviving works include a setting of verses from Lamentations, and instrumental music for viols.

Thomas Morley, in his A Plaine and Easie Introduction to Practicall Musicke (1597) extols him as one of the greatest English composers, equal to Orlando di Lasso. He notes White's bold harmonies, and includes him in a list of seven eminent Tudor composers that includes "Fayrfax, Taverner, Sheppard, Whyte, Parsons and Mr Byrd." Some MS partbooks now at Christ Church, Oxford dated about 1581 contain the tribute "Maxima musarum nostrarum gloria White' Tu peris, actemum sed tua musa manet" ("Thou, O White, greatest glory of our muses, dost perish, but thy muse endureth for ever").

Life 
According to Arnold, the first glimpse we get of Robert White, son of an organ builder, is as a chorister, and then an adult singer in the choir of Trinity College, Cambridge from 1554 to 1562. During that time, in 1560, he received a Bachelorship of Music from Cambridge University, and in 1562 he moved the few miles to Ely, where he succeeded his father-in-law Christopher Tye as Master of the Choristers and married Christopher Tye's daughter in 1565.

He accepted a similar post at Chester Cathedral in 1566, where he succeeded Richard Saywell and took part in the Chester Whitsuntide pageants during the years 1567 to 1569. Such was his reputation as a choir trainer that in 1570 he was appointed organist and master of the choristers of Westminster Abbey.

White and his family died in a virulent outbreak of plague in the Westminster area in 1574. Although White seems to have spent much of his life working to the north of the capital, his will (dated 7 November 1574) stated that he left property of some substance in Sussex and directed that he be buried in St. Margaret's, Westminster "nere unto my children". White was buried on 11 November 1574 aged around 36.

Though Robert White stood so high among mid-sixteenth century musicians, his compositions were almost utterly neglected till unearthed by Charles Burney.

Music 
Fortunately quite a large number of White's compositions have survived, several of which were included in the Dow Partbooks. His surviving 17 Latin motets, one Latin Magnificat, two sets of the Lamentations, and eight anthems are all sufficient to place him in the front rank of English composers of the Elizabethan age. His surviving non-choral works include In nomine for viols and his hexachord fantasia for keyboard.

Many of the motets are settings of the Psalms, characterized by continuous points of imitation, with the beginnings of each phrase set syllabically. His Lamentations, set for five voices, has a flavour in advance of his period, as also his motet Peccatum peccavit Jerusalem and Regina Coeli.

White's works fall into two main groups: those that could have been used in Sarum services and devotions under Mary, and those (psalm-motets and Lamentations) that were probably written in Elizabeth's reign.

The Sarum works comprise antiphons, hymns and a respond, all on equal-note cantus firmi, and a large-scale six-part Magnificat that, like two of Taverner's settings, has a psalm tone as the tenor of the full-choir sections. The Magnificat bears the date 1570 in the fragmentary source in the Bodleian Library, but the style makes it very much easier to take this as the year of copying than as the year of composition. For example, at Sicut locutus, a four-part section with the plainsong in the mean, mostly in longs and breves, the accompanying parts have numerous crotchet runs, which, although considerably more numerous and more hectic, give something of the same effect as the similarly scored Et incarnatus of Taverner's Gloria tibi Trinitas. But there are also traces of the repetitive techniques characteristic of White in his full-choir motets. The key point here is the exchanging of material between pairs of voices of equal range throughout a four-part or six-part texture. Tallis and Sheppard reversed a single pair of (countertenor) parts when the music for one verse of a hymn was re-used, or very occasionally when a set of entries was re-stated.

The Compline hymn Christe qui lux es et dies follows the established pattern of alternating plainchant verses with polyphonic ones that incorporate the chant, in this instance in the tenor part. Its text, an evening prayer for peaceful rest, full of imagery of light and darkness, seems to have held special appeal for White, who made four separate settings of it.

Works 
Ad te levavi oculos meos
Appropinquet deprecatio mea
Christe qui lux es I, II, III & IV
Deus, misereatur nostri 
Domine quis habitabit I, II, III
Exaudiat te
Exaudiat te Dominus
Fantasias III & IV
In Nomine V a 5
Justus es, Domine
Lamentations 5vv
Lamentations 6vv
Libera me, Domine de morte aeterna
The Lord Bless Us and Keep Us 
Lord, who shall dwell
Miserere mei, Deus
Magnificat
Manus Tuae Fecerunt Me
Mr White his song
Mr White's Trumpet Tune
O Praise God
Portio mea
Precanur sancta, Domine
Regina caeli
Six Organ Fantasias
Tota pulchra es

Notes

References
Denis Arnold ed., (1983) The New Oxford Companion to Music, Oxford University Press
J C Bridge 'The organists of Chester Cathedral: Part I, 1541 to 1644; Part II, 1663 to 1877'
Robert White, Complete Latin Sacred Music, 3 vols., edited by David Mateer. Early English Church Music, 28, 29 and 32. London, 198–6.
 Article 'Robert White Composer & Cathedral Organist' by Ian Thomas in Chester & North East Wales Organists' & Choirmasters' Association Newsletter,2009

External links
 
Thomas Morley's "Introduction to Practical Music"
Chester Cathedral Website

1530s births
1574 deaths
Classical composers of church music
Renaissance composers
16th-century English composers
Master of the Choristers at Westminster Abbey
English male classical composers
English classical composers
Organists of Ely Cathedral